The First Erhard cabinet was the government of Germany between 17 October 1963 and 26 October 1965. Led by the Christian Democratic Union Ludwig Erhard, the cabinet was a coalition between the Christian Democratic Union (CDU) and the Free Democratic Party (FDP). The Vice-Chancellor was the Free Democrat Erich Mende (FDP).

Composition 

|}

Erhard I
1963 establishments in West Germany
1965 disestablishments in West Germany
Cabinets established in 1965
Cabinets disestablished in 1966
Erhard I
Ludwig Erhard